Hoshii may refer to the following:
 , train station in Tagawa, Fukuoka
 , Japanese singer, entertainer, and actress

See also
Hoshi (disambiguation)